Basundhara Bhusal is a Nepali movie and theater actor. She was one of the actresses in the first Nepali movie Aama (1964). Since then, she has acted in at least 135 feature films and 60 TV programs. She started her career in theater, acting in plays at the Rastriya Nachghar since the 1960s.

Some of her notable films are Ek Number Ko Pakhe, Truck Driver, Hijo Aaja Bholi (first Nepali film under a private banner and fourth overall), Paral Ko Aago (adapted from eponymous story by Guru Prasad Mainali), Chhakka Panja (second highest grossing Nepali film of all time) and Prasad (2018 film).

Bhusal received the Lifetime Achievement Award at the National Film Awards (Nepal) in 2016.

Bhusal is the co-founder and president of Bhuwan Chaitya Basundhara Foundation. She is known to volunteer for social awareness programs to help educate the public on important issues. She has spoken about gender pay gap in the Nepali movie industry.

Filmography 
Bhusal has played in over 135 feature films; the list here only includes a small number of them.

See also 

Bhuwan Chand
Gauri Malla
Mithila Sharma

References

External links
 

Nepalese film actresses
Nepalese stage actresses
Nepalese television actresses
Actresses in Nepali cinema
Actresses in Nepali television
20th-century Nepalese actresses
21st-century Nepalese actresses
Year of birth missing (living people)
Living people